The All-American Bowl was an annual postseason  college football bowl game played at Legion Field in Birmingham, Alabama from 1977 to 1990. The game was known as the Hall of Fame Classic from 1977 to 1985.

In 1986, the National Football Foundation and College Hall of Fame decided to relocate the Hall of Fame bowl game to Tampa, Florida, where it eventually became known as the Outback Bowl (now the ReliaQuest Bowl). The game in Birmingham continued as the All-American Bowl, which was played for five years under a different organizing body.

When the Southeastern Conference expanded to twelve schools and began contesting a SEC Championship Game in 1992, Birmingham officials chose to host the conference title game and abandon the All-American Bowl. The SEC championship was moved to Atlanta's Georgia Dome two years later, leaving Legion Field without any Division I-A postseason college football until 2006, when ESPN and the city agreed to establish a new post-season game, the Birmingham Bowl.

The game
The All-American Bowl played host to a number of successful teams from the premier college football conferences of the time (the Atlantic Coast Conference, Big Eight (now Big 12 Conference), Big Ten Conference, Southeastern Conference and Southwest Conference). All of them placed teams in the All-American Bowl in various years. At least one of the power conferences fielded teams in the All-American Bowl in every year of its existence; often, two of those premier conferences met in the game. The Southeastern Conference and Atlantic Coast Conference each placed five teams into the All-American Bowl. The Big Ten Conference proved to be the least successful conference, having never won a game despite placing teams in four different years.

Game results

Most valuable players

Conference records
Southwest Conference 3–0 (1.000)
Atlantic Coast Conference 4–1 (.800)
Southeastern Conference 3–2 (.600)
Western Athletic Conference 1–1 (.500)
Big Eight Conference 1–2 (.333)
Big Ten Conference 0–4 (.000)

Ranked teams
On several occasions, the All-American Bowl winners finished the season ranked in the AP Top Twenty poll:
Texas A&M finished #19 in the final 1978 AP poll after defeating #19 Iowa State.
West Virginia finished #16 in the final 1983 AP poll after defeating Kentucky.
Kentucky finished #19 in the final 1984 AP poll and the final UPI poll after defeating #20 Wisconsin.
Georgia Tech finished #19 in the final 1985 AP poll after defeating Michigan State.
Texas Tech finished #19 in the final 1989 AP poll after defeating #20 Duke.

References

See also
List of college bowl games

 
Defunct college football bowls
Sports competitions in Birmingham, Alabama
College football bowls in Alabama